James Russell Wiggins (December 4, 1903 – November 19, 2000) was an American managing editor of The Washington Post and United States Ambassador to the United Nations.

In Minnesota
Wiggins' first job in journalism was as reporter for the Rock County Star in Luverne, Minnesota immediately out of high school. In 1925, at the age of 22, he borrowed $10,000 and bought the newspaper. In 1930, he moved to St. Paul to become an editorial writer for the St. Paul Pioneer Press and later served as Washington correspondent before becoming managing editor in 1938.

Washington Post years
During World War II, Wiggins served in Army Air Corps intelligence. While serving in the army, he met Philip Graham who would later become publisher of The Washington Post.

Graham made Wiggins managing editor of The Post in 1947 and promoted him to executive editor in 1955. During 1960 to 1968, he worked as editor and executive vice president.

One of his first acts as editor was to end racial identification in news articles. In 1954 Wiggins Received the Elijah Parish Lovejoy Award as well as an honorary Doctor of Laws degree from Colby College. He was president of the American Society of Newspaper Editors in 1959-60. Wiggins took over the Post'''s editorial page in 1961.

U.N. ambassador
President Lyndon Johnson appointed Wiggins U.S. ambassador to the United Nations in 1968 to 1969 during the Lyndon Johnson presidency.  In 1969 Wiggins received an LL.D. from Bates College.

Later years
After his tenure as ambassador, Wiggins moved to Brooklin, Maine where he became editor and publisher of The Ellsworth American of Ellsworth, Maine. He received the Eugene Cervi Award from the International Society of Weekly Newspaper Editors in 1987.

Wiggins was married to his high school sweetheart, Mabel Preston, and their marriage lasted 67 years until her death in 1990.

References

 Estabrook, Robert H. "James Wiggins, journalistic legend". The Masthead''. Spring 2001

External links

James Russell Wiggins Papers at the Raymond H. Fogler Library, University of Maine

1903 births
2000 deaths
American newspaper editors
American newspaper reporters and correspondents
Elijah Parish Lovejoy Award recipients
Lyndon B. Johnson administration cabinet members
People from Brooklin, Maine
People from Luverne, Minnesota
Permanent Representatives of the United States to the United Nations
The Washington Post people